German submarine U-173 was a Type IXC U-boat of Nazi Germany's Kriegsmarine during World War II.

She was laid down at the DeSchiMAG AG Weser yard in Bremen as yard number 1013, launched on 11 August 1941 and commissioned on 15 November with Fregattenkapitän Heinz-Ehler Beucke in command.

U-173 began her service career with training as part of the 4th U-boat Flotilla. She was reassigned to the 2nd flotilla for operations on 1 July 1942.

Design
German Type IXC submarines were slightly larger than the original Type IXBs. U-173 had a displacement of  when at the surface and  while submerged. She had two shafts and two  propellers.

U-173 was fitted with six  torpedo tubes (four fitted at the bow and two at the stern), 22 torpedoes, one  SK C/32 naval gun, 180 rounds, and a  SK C/30 as well as a  C/30 anti-aircraft gun. The boat had a complement of forty-eight.

Service history

First patrol
The boat departed Kiel on 15 June 1942, moved through the North Sea and negotiated the gap between Iceland and the Faroe Islands. She crossed the Atlantic Ocean and entered the Caribbean Sea. She entered Lorient, on the French Atlantic coast, on 20 September.

Second patrol
The submarine attempted the disruption of the Operation Torch landings (the invasion of North Africa) on 11 November 1942. She attacked convoy UGF-1 which was at anchor in Fedhala Roads. She hit three ships, sinking  and damaging two more.

A few days later and further north, U-173 torpedoed but did not sink , on 15 November. This vessel also survived the war, not being broken up until 1974.

Loss
All fifty-seven hands were lost.

Summary of raiding history

References

Notes

Citations

Bibliography

Further reading

External links

German Type IX submarines
U-boats commissioned in 1941
U-boats sunk in 1942
World War II submarines of Germany
1941 ships
World War II shipwrecks in the Atlantic Ocean
Ships built in Bremen (state)
U-boats sunk by depth charges
U-boats sunk by US warships
Ships lost with all hands
Maritime incidents in November 1942